Wahlrod is an Ortsgemeinde – a community belonging to a Verbandsgemeinde – in the Westerwaldkreis in Rhineland-Palatinate, Germany.

Geography

The community lies in the northern Westerwaldkreis and borders on Altenkirchen district. Wahlrod belongs to the Verbandsgemeinde of Hachenburg, a kind of collective municipality. Its seat is in the like-named town.

History
In 1249, Wahlrod had its first documentary mention.

Politics

The municipal council is made up of 13 council members, including the honorary mayor (Bürgermeister), who were elected in a majority vote in a municipal election on 13 June 2004.

Economy and infrastructure

Transport
Running right through the community is Bundesstraße 8, leading from Limburg an der Lahn to Siegburg. The nearest Autobahn interchanges are in Dierdorf and Neuwied on the A 3 (Cologne–Frankfurt), some 25 km away. The nearest InterCityExpress stop is the railway station at Montabaur on the Cologne-Frankfurt high-speed rail line.

References

External links
 Wahlrod 
 Wahlrod in the collective municipality’s Web pages 

Municipalities in Rhineland-Palatinate
Westerwaldkreis